Khorshid (The Sun in English) was a Persian daily published in Iran briefly between October 2008 and March 2009. The daily supported former President Mahmoud Ahmedinejad.

History and profile
Khorshid was established in October 2008 by Muhammad Paryab who was an aide to the former President Mahmoud Ahmedinejad. The paper was owned by the Social Security Organization. The daily was managed by Saeed Mortazavi.

Khorshid was a full color tabloid daily and provides news about all topics from political issues to sports and soap operas. Robert Tait of The Guardian described it as The Sun newspaper of Iran. Khorshid folded in March 2009 due to the economic problems and resignation of journalists.

Political leaning
The daily advocated Mahmoud Ahmedinejad in the 2009 presidential election.

References

2008 establishments in Iran
Newspapers established in 2008
Defunct newspapers published in Iran
Persian-language newspapers
2009 disestablishments in Iran
Publications disestablished in 2009